The Court of Jurisdictional Disputes (also translated as Court of Jurisdictional Conflicts) is one of the four higher courts in the Republic of Turkey. It is tasked with disputes between civil and administrative courts concerning their jurisdiction and judgments. Before the abolishment of military courts in 2017, the court also looked at the disputes involving the military courts.

Constitution 
The role and tasks of the Court of Jurisdictional Disputes are prescribed by the Constitution of Turkey within the section on the supreme courts.
According to Article 158 of the Turkish Constitution (1982),  "The Court of Jurisdictional Disputes shall be empowered to deliver final judgments in disputes between civil and administrative courts concerning their jurisdiction and judgments.

The organization of the Court of Jurisdictional Disputes, the qualifications and electoral procedure of its members, and its functioning shall be regulated by law. The office of president of this Court shall be held by a member delegated by the Constitutional Court from among its own members. Decisions of the Constitutional Court shall take precedence in jurisdictional disputes between the Constitutional Court and other courts."

List of presidents

See also
Judicial system of Turkey

References

External links 
 Official Website 

Courts in Turkey
Courts and tribunals established in 1945
1945 establishments in Turkey